Water blue, also known as aniline blue, Acid blue 22, Soluble Blue 3M, Marine Blue V, or C.I. 42755, is a chemical compound used as a stain in histology.  Water blue stains collagen blue in tissue sections. It is soluble in water and slightly soluble in ethanol.

Water blue is also available in mixture with methyl blue, under the names Aniline Blue WS, Aniline blue, China blue, or Soluble blue.

It can be used in the Mallory's trichrome stain of connective tissue and Gömöri trichrome stain of muscle tissue. It is used in differential staining.

See also 
RAL 5021 Water blue

References 

Triarylmethane dyes
Staining dyes
Benzenesulfonates
Organic sodium salts
Anilines
Acid dyes